Paul McDonald (born William Paul McDonald) is an American singer-songwriter from Huntsville, Alabama, who as of 2011 resides in Nashville. McDonald placed 8th on the tenth season of American Idol and since 2005, he has been the lead singer of the band Hightide Blues which was renamed The Grand Magnolias in 2010.

Early life
McDonald was born to Susan and David McDonald, in Auburn / Opelika. His father is a clinical psychologist and his mother teaches occupational therapy at the University of Tennessee Chattanooga. McDonald was raised in Huntsville, Alabama. He is a graduate of Huntsville High School, where he also played wide receiver on the varsity football team. He was in the school's play, "The Wizard of Oz" which was directed by Mike Chappell.

Career

The Grand Magnolias
In August 2010, McDonald and his band members moved to Nashville and launched a campaign to let their fans choose a new name for the band. The group's first album under its new name, entitled The Grand Magnolias, was released in 2011. The songs were written by McDonald and band member Jonathan Pears and produced by Dan Hannon and Ken Coomer. The album has seen a boost in sales since Paul McDonald's appearance on American Idol, and it reached number twelve on the Billboard Heatseekers chart and had sold 9,000 copies by April 27, 2011. iTunes pulled the album from its store, without explanation, and the sales dropped off 60% from the previous week. A week later the album returned, again without explanation.

When the band learned that McDonald had made it through to the Hollywood round they put together a content release campaign to maximize the exposure from the show.

American Idol
On January 27, 2011, McDonald received a golden ticket to compete in Hollywood from judges Steven Tyler, Jennifer Lopez and Randy Jackson, and made it into the Top 24 by singing an original song, "American Dreams." He was one of ten candidates chosen as a finalist based on public voting. Thirteen competed in the finals.

Since entering the competition, McDonald has made use of the social networking site Twitter to communicate with his fans and promote his band, The Grand Magnolias. The album also debuted on the Billboard Heatseekers chart before McDonald even sang in the show's semi-final round. He was the first 2011 Idol hopeful to reach 50,000 followers on his newly created official American Idol Twitter account. McDonald continues to be one of the most popular American Idol Season 10 competitors on the social networking site.

McDonald was eliminated from the show on April 14, 2011, finishing in eighth place.

Performances and results

 Due to the judges using their one save to save Casey Abrams, the Top 11 remained intact for another week, when two contestants were eliminated.
 When Ryan Seacrest announced the results in the particular night, McDonald was in the bottom three, but was the only contestant declared safe as both Naima Adedapo and Thia Megia were eliminated.

Post-Idol
McDonald was one of the 11 performers in the 2011 American Idols Live Tour, which began in West Valley City, Utah, on July 6, 2011, and ended in Rochester, New York, on September 10, 2011. On May 25, 2011, he appeared on Rachael Ray along with Stefano Langone and Pia Toscano. McDonald even recorded a song, "Now That I've Found You", with his wife Nikki Reed, which debuted on Ryan Seacrest's radio show on November 15, 2011. The couple released their first EP together, The Best Part, on October 29, 2012.

In September 2012, McDonald appeared in a Parenthood episode as a musician who used Crosby and Adam's recording space, The Luncheonette, and sang a new song, "Counting Stars."

McDonald and his wife, Nikki Reed, starred in Hanson's 2013 music video for "Get the Girl Back". The video was filmed in January 2013, and released in April 2013. Other famous faces in the video include Kat Dennings, Drake Bell, Drew Seeley, Amy Paffrath, and Alex Beh.  On July 8, 2014, McDonald and Reed released an album titled I'm Not Falling.

In 2014, McDonald launched his solo career by releasing a single, "Bright Lights," on October 7, 2014, and a video released on November 3, 2014.

Personal life
McDonald met actress Nikki Reed on the red carpet at the premiere of Red Riding Hood in March 2011. The moment they met was broadcast on an American Idol episode as part of a segment that showed McDonald and his fellow contestants attending the premiere. McDonald and Reed soon began dating and moved in together shortly after that. Their engagement was confirmed in June 2011, and they married on October 16, 2011, in Malibu, California. In March 2014, McDonald and Reed announced that they had separated. Reed filed for divorce on May 16, 2014, citing irreconcilable differences. The divorce was finalized in January 2015.

Discography

Albums
As part of Hightide Blues
2007: Hightide Blues (EP)
Track list of Hightide Blues EP:
"I Can't" (4:09)
"4:15" (3:24)
"Will She" (3:02)
"Tired of Leavin'" (5:16)
"Jennifer" (4:54)

2008: Love Come Easy 
Track list of Love Come Easy album:
"Katie, Can You Hear Me?" (3:10)
"Far from Home" (4:59)
"Dreamin' Alone" (3:52)
"Let It Roll" (3:13)
"Giving Up On You" (3:57)
"Merle's Last Stand" (2:05)
"Black Crows" (4:30)
"Dancing with the Angels (Meg's Song)" (4:29)

As part of The Grand Magnolias
2010: The Grand Magnolias 
Track list of The Grand Magnolias album:
"Sing Out" (4:07)
"American Dreams" (3:46)
"Fly Me to the Moon" (3:27)
"I Can't Remember" (3:14)
"No More One More Nights" (3:51)
"Heartbreak" (5:01)
"Four Fifteen" (5:06)
"Whoa" (4:22)
"Top of the World" (3:11)
"Please Believe Me" (4:08)

Paul McDonald and Nikki Reed
2012: The Best Part-EP 
Track list of The Best Part-EP Album:
"Bouquet of Lies (Ghost in Apt. 8)"
"All I'm Asking"
"The Best Part"
"Now That I've Found You (Version 2)"
"Goodbye"
2014: I'm Not Falling

Extended plays

Appearances
 "All I've Ever Needed" (with Nikki Reed) — The Twilight Saga: Breaking Dawn – Part 2 soundtrack (2012)

References

External links
Paul McDonald on American Idol
Paul McDonald Official website
The Grand Magnolias Official website

Living people
21st-century American singers
American Idol participants
American male singer-songwriters
American rock singers
American rock songwriters
Musicians from Nashville, Tennessee
People from Auburn, Alabama
Musicians from Huntsville, Alabama
Singer-songwriters from Tennessee
21st-century American male singers
Year of birth missing (living people)
Singer-songwriters from Alabama